Rémy Rioux (born 1969) is a French high-ranking civil servant. He serves as the chief executive of the French Development Agency.

Early life
Rémy Rioux was born on 26 June 1969 in Neuilly-sur-Seine near Paris. He graduated from the  École Normale Supérieure, Sciences Po and the École nationale d'administration. In 1995, at the age of 26, he completed an internship in Benin.

Career
Rioux worked at the Court of Audit (1997-2000, 2002–2004) and the Trésor public. In the government of Prime Minister Lionel Jospin, he was an adviser to Interior Minister Daniel Vaillant from 2000 until 2002.

During his time at the French State Holdings Agency (APE) from 2007 until 2009, Rioux served on the boards of directors of France Médias Monde, France Télévisions, Groupe ADP, the Port of Le Havre, the RATP Group, Renault and SNCF. In 2011, he was a member of the task force set up at the French Treasury for the French presidencies of the G8 and G20. From 2012 until 2014, he served as chief of staff to Finance Minister Pierre Moscovici, in the government of Prime Minister Jean-Marc Ayrault.

From 2014 until 2016, Rioux served as Deputy Secretary General of the Ministry of Foreign Affairs under minister Laurent Fabius. In 2015, President François Hollande appointed him to develop reform proposals for both AFD and state-owned bank CDC, including a possible merger; however, the project was eventually abandoned.

Rioux has been serving as the chief executive of the French Development Agency since June 2016. Following the suggestion of Prime Minister Édouard Philippe, President Emmanuel Macron reappointed him for another four-year term in 2019.

Other activities
 European Council on Foreign Relations (ECFR), Member (since 2021)
 International Olympic Committee (IOC), Member of the Commission on Public Affairs And Social Development Through Sport
 La France s’engage Foundation, Member of the Board
 Proparco, chairman of the Board of Directors (since 2016)
 European Investment Bank (EIB), Alternate Member of the Board of Directors (since 2016)
 Organisation for Joint Armament Cooperation (OCCAR), Member of the Board of Auditors (2002-2004)

Personal life
Rioux is married, and he has three children.

References

1969 births
Living people
People from Neuilly-sur-Seine
École Normale Supérieure alumni
Sciences Po alumni
École nationale d'administration alumni